Nevus depigmentosus is a loss of pigment in the skin which can be easily differentiated from vitiligo. Although age factor has not much involvement in the nevus depigmentosus but in about 19% of the cases these are noted at birth. Their size may however grow in proportion to growth of the body. The distribution is also fairly stable and are nonprogressive hypopigmented patches. The exact cause of nevus depigmentosus is still not clearly understood. A sporadic defect in the embryonic development has been suggested to be a causative factor.
It has been described as "localised albinism", though this is incorrect.

Those with nevus depigmentosus may be prone to sunburn due to the lack of pigment, and the patient should use good sun protection. Sunscreen should be applied to all exposed skin, since reduced tanning of normal skin will decrease the contrast with hypopigmented skin. Most patients with nevus depigmentosus do not pursue treatment for their lesion. There is no way to repigment the skin. If, however, the lesion is of cosmetic concern, camouflage makeup is effective. If the lesion is small one could also consider excision.

Signs and symptoms
These are localized white spots on skin which may affect any area of the body, but these white spots are quite stable lesions. In the majority of patients, the lesions are not completely achromic, but are hypopigmented and resemble splashed paint. The individual lesions are permanent and there are no effective therapies for re-pigmenting this nevus. If there is hair in an affected area, it is usually colourless or white.

Causes
All 3 components that is melanocytes, melanosomes, and melanogenesis is normal but the defect lies in the transfer of melanosomes.

Diagnosis
Initial assessment can be made based on the presence of depigmented patches, and confirmed with a skin biopsy.

Treatment
Different therapeutic modalities have been attempted to repigment the lesions of nevus depigmentosus such as PUVA, excimer laser, and different grafting techniques. PUVA therapy has not been shown to be beneficial. Successful repigmentation was reported in a single case with 14 sessions of excimer laser treatment. Though the repigmentation of nevus depigmentosus is possible by grafting techniques, the results are inconsistent and recurrence is possible. In consideration of the experience of other authors and us, the quality and retention of pigment are unpredictable. These factors need to be considered while consulting and offering any treatment to the patient of nevus depigmentosus.

See also
 Albinism
 Alphos
 Leucism
 List of cutaneous conditions
 Melanism
 Nevus
 Pityriasis alba
 Quadrichrome vitiligo
 Selective ultraviolet phototherapy
 Vitiligo

References

Disturbances of human pigmentation